Private Investigator! is an adventure story arc of the Philippine comic strip series Pugad Baboy, created by Pol Medina Jr. and originally published in the Philippine Daily Inquirer. This particular story arc lasts 77 strips long and ran July to October, 2000, in the light of the then-recent bombings in some shopping malls. In 2001, the story arc was reprinted in PB the 13th, the thirteenth book compilation of the comic strip series. The story arc's title comes from the fact that every time Dagul's alter ego Bardagul Kapote's name is mentioned by the unseen narrator, he always follows it with the phrase "Private Investigator," which is what Bardagul Kapote is.

"Kapote" is Filipino for raincoat and Bardagul's trench coat can serve the same purpose as a raincoat in the Philippine setting.

Synopsis

Dagul, Debbie, and their housekeeper Brosia are watching a very gory movie in a shopping mall cinema when suddenly, an explosion is heard, sending the other moviegoers into panic. In the aftermath of the explosion, Brosia helps the janitor collect the debris from the explosion, which originated from the women's restroom, into a garbage bag. Brosia and her masters take home the garbage bag, even before police could obtain any evidence from it.

At home, Dagul tells Debbie that the garbage bag they took home might contain evidence related to the bombing. But examining it should be done by a very skilled detective. Dagul and Brosia then disappear and reappear as Bardagul Kapote, a trench coat-clad private investigator, and Brossy, his blonde secretary, both dressed in a 50s get-up.

Bardagul then examines the contents of the garbage bag. The absence of shrapnel tells him that the bomb used in the explosion is not a fragmentation bomb and neither it is an incendiary bomb because the garbage is still intact. Bardagul also finds some receipts, a classified ad from a newspaper, a leaf, and a SIM card. He gets his cellular phone and inserts the SIM card. The SIM card is locked, but an acquaintance, Noks Ramos (Igno), manages to unlock it in only four seconds.

Bardagul checks the SIM's log and calls the last number listed. The number leads to an Ilocano-speaking man. Since neither Bardagul nor Brossy can understand Ilocano and an interpreter is nowhere to be found, Bardagul hangs up. In the process, he finds out that the SIM is a prepaid one because its account has P460 left.

Bardagul then has a K-9 detective (Polgas) examine the physical make-up to the piece of debris from the explosion, which is revealed to be made up of cellulose, ethanolamine, nitrogen tri-iodide and activated carbon. He also finds out from his snitches that the fireworks business in Bulacan is on the rise again despite being in the off season as pyrotechnics sales from that province are transacted in several restaurants in Quezon City.

While about to go forward, and in an almost impossible instance, Brossy calls Bardagul through cellphone, even though he is yet to find out about its number. Back in the office, Brossy explains that the number of the SIM is the one posted on the classified ad. Furthermore, she tells him that fourteen of the contacts listed in the SIM are phone numbers to several fireworks factories in Bulacan.

Based from the info, Bardagul deduces that the perpetrator of the bombing in the mall is a woman named Lita (the one mentioned by the Ilocano-speaking man earlier) and the explosive used in the bombing is a pyrotechnic device from Bulacan. He then asks for the receipts and the leaf that is among the evidence. The receipts have names of restaurants in Quezon City specializing in Ilocano cuisine and all of which list a dish called "inabraw nga saluyot." The leaf happens to be a saluyot leaf, which is predominant in Ilocano dishes.

Using the new information, Bardagul visits the Kaspagarigan Restaurant in Quezon City. He asks one of the crew about the receipt and the man remembers that in the Tuesday before, a female diner ordered "inabraw nga saluyot" and her male companion ordered "minatamis na langka" (sweetened jackfruit). The female diner then left, leaving the companion behind. One of the restaurant's guest relations officers later tells Bardagul that the male companion is from Bulacan who gave the female diner a box. The female diner also talked with the manager, telling him that she wanted to order a lot of goats for her farm in Laoag.

As Bardagul is about to leave, a man points a shotgun at his back. But Bardagul uses some aikido to disarm the gunman and tosses him to the fence of the restaurant. Another member of the crew helps the man up and tells Bardagul that the man he has just manhandled is a security guard who may have mistaken him for someone else. Bardagul then leaves the scene and hides in the tall grasses surrounding the restaurant.

While hiding, he peeks at the crew member who has just helped the gunman who threatened him. The crew member is dialing a phone, but Bardagul can't see the buttons because of his distance. Suddenly, Bardagul's cellphone rings, telling him that the man is calling him, thinking he is Lita, his main suspect. Bardagul disguises his voice (first by singing the Ilocano folk song "Pamulinawen") to a female one. Using this cover, Bardagul finds out that Lita is in vacation in Fort Ilocandia, a hotel resort in Ilocos Norte. He then packs up and drives twelve hours to the said hotel.

Once at the hotel, he distracts the people at the concierge by telling them that Robin Padilla and Vina Morales are checking in just as he does. While the people at desk are running outside to  look for the two actors, Bardagul checks the guest list and finds no one named Lita. He then checks the room service list and finds out that someone in Room 400 has ordered "inabraw nga saluyot." So when the desk people return to their posts after their futile search, he asks the concierge to check him into Room 398 for "superstitious" reasons. Room 398 happens to be near Room 400, where Lita is supposed to be staying. He sets up a trap at the door to enable him to wake up at the moment Lita leaves the hotel. He then goes to sleep, tired because of the long drive.

At four in the morning the next day, the trap sets off waking Bardagul up. He opens the door finding several goons about to beat him up with clubs. He takes care of each of them, but finds that Room 400 has been vacated. Furthermore, guns are beginning to cock. He plans to use his .38 revolver, but the goons' guns seem to be more powerful. So he escapes, while firing back at the goons.

Bardagul's pistol is a special one because it carries eight bullets of different kinds: one blank bullet, two rubber-tipped ones, three brass-tipped ones, and two double-action ones. At this moment, he loads bullets that explode on impact and shoots the balcony where the goons are. He then drives off.

While driving away, he tries to call Brossy, but there is no answer. Then, Bardagul remembers the address of the Ilocano-speaking man who talked to him days before. He is about to proceed and his cellphone rings again. It is one of the goons he has fought with earlier and he has kidnapped Brossy. Pretending to be Lita he tells the goon that he has done a good job and asks where he should drop the "hostage." The goon tells him that he will drop the "hostage" in a warehouse in Balacad Road. The location is so detailed, Bardagul immediately realizes that the goons set him up. He then drives off.

He parks near a perimeter fence behind Lita's farm. He crawls under the fence when the Ilocano-speaking man, whom he identifies as Abraham, finds him and asks him about his business in Abraham's farm. Bardagul tells Abraham that he is no robber and he is just finding Lita. The mere mention of Lita earns Abraham's ire and starts to say curses while his daughter, a familiar face to readers of the strip, tries to separate the two so Abraham can calm down.

Abraham's daughter explains to Bardagul that her father pawned half of his land to Lita. When it was time to pay up, Lita did not return the land. In fact, when Lita was about to resell her land, Abraham borrowed some money to get the land back to him; Lita then stopped the sale. The daughter does not even know how Lita transferred the land deeds to her name.

Bardagul tells Abraham's daughter that he is about to infiltrate the warehouse on Lita's land and he tells her to call the other farmers for help in case he needs it.

Bardagul infiltrates the warehouse, breaks the lock and enters. Inside, he finds boxes of potassium nitrate, which can be used as ingredients for explosives. But for him, this is not enough evidence. So he searches for any box of "lolo thunder," a powerful kind of firecracker, and finds one hidden among the boxes of potassium nitrate. While he photographs the evidence, someone is calling him. It is Lita's eight goons, holding Brossy hostage and are looking for him. One of them dials the number of Lita's SIM card and Bardagul's phone rings. In an attempt to distract the goons, he fires three shots to the roof. While the goons are looking away, Brossy kicks the goon holding her. She even imitates Trinity's kick in The Matrix on another guard. She then escapes while Bardagul fires exploding bullets on the boxes. But the theatrics stop when Brossy is once again captured, this time by Lita, who is really Abraham's daughter, former Lt.-Col. Violeta Kainam (the main antagonist of the story arc Col. Manyakis). She is accompanied by her partner, former Gen. Cresendo Lagumbay (alias Sendong Langib, her counterpart in the story arc Retraining).

While the two ex-military officials tie Brossy and Bardagul up and introduce themselves, Brossy identifies Lagumbay as the big boss of Lucdet Security Agency. He clarifies that he is the big boss of forty security agencies, all of which hire ex-soldiers.

Kainam explains to Bardagul that the boxes are laced with trinitrotoluene and she can even make bombs make from ordinary fireworks. She takes advantage of making and exploding them because mall security has again been relaxed. Lagumbay and Kainam decide to leave Bardagul and Brossy tied up and shoot each of them down using Bardagul's revolver. But before that plan is set into motion, several Ilocano farmers from Bacalad, led by Abraham, charge into the warehouse, having disabled the goons. In response, Lagumbay guns Brossy down, not realizing that he has fired a blank. While Lagumbay shoots relentlessly, Bardagul rolls on him, knocking him out. As the farmers, particularly Abraham, release Bardagul from the ropes, Bardagul sees a truck driving away. He throws a box of "lolo thunder" towards the truck and shoots using his revolver's double-action bullets (those that explode on impact). The truck is torched, but Lita is seen driving away the other way in a sports car. So he takes Brossy (who still thinks she is dead) and drives after her, even using nitro to get close to her faster.

By the time they approach Vigan, Bardagul and Brossy realize that Kainam cannot be found. Brossy suggests that Kainam may not go to Manila, but Bardagul tells her that Kainam is going to Manila, but not by land. So they turn back. Calling the Laoag International Airport as Victoriano Lecaros, a member of Bongbong Marcos's staff, Bardagul finds out that a military flight is leaving the airport, bound for Manila, and a white sports car (Kainam's 1957 Corvette roadster) is found parked in the runway. They reach the airport as the military plane is taxiing in the runway.

Brossy places two packs of TNT in Bardagul's trench coat pocket. Bardagul gives his car's cigarette lighter and she places it alongside the two packs. Brossy hangs the trench coat on plane's left hind wing and it explodes, disabling the tail rudder. The pilot (the goon whose right hand is bandaged) and Kainam alight from the plane to see the damage as Bardagul and Brossy restrain them. A third person comes out of the plane. It is the gunman whom Bardagul disarmed back in the Kaspagarigan Restaurant. The bandaged goon identifies the man as Melecio, a champion skeet shooter. So Bardagul throws another pack of TNT towards Melecio. Melecio aims and shoots it perfectly, even taunting Bardagul by telling him that TNT does not ignite by shotgun blast. Luckily, Brossy has lit a flare and like a bride tossing a bouquet, Brossy hurls the flare to Melecio's direction.

The TNT spread upon the poor skeet shooter lights up, causing him to accidentally pull his rifle's trigger. The bullet from the rifle makes a hole on the plane's left engine. The plane's fuel, which is 100-octane gas, leaks from the wing and is about to explode. Worse, the plane is full of TNT. Sensing some danger, Bardagul and Brossy run off to their car, with Kainam and the bandaged goon joining them. They drive away from the plane as it blows up.

Bardagul then turns over Kainam, Lagumbay, and their goons (Melecio included) to local authorities, as well as the evidence against them, except for the SIM card, which Bardagul plans to use up its balance first before surrendering it.

Bardagul and Brossy then take time out in Pagudpud Beach in Ilocos Norte. There, Bardagul discusses the confirmed doubt that Lita's (Kainam) actions against her father, Abraham, are just an inside job because their farms are right next to each other and both have saluyot planted on them. So to make sure, he asked Abraham and the other farmers' help in staking Lita. He also explains that Kainam collaborated with Lagumbay in his security business to create terrorist threats on malls, forcing the mall owners to hire more guards, and lose money in the process. He also finds out that Brossy was kidnapped because she was flirting with a security guard, just as he suspected. They then return to Manila, having finished their mission.

Trivia
 The series mentioned Ilocano stereotypes like Pamulinawen, Ilocanos' love for inabraw, a dish with vegetables and fish sauce, Ilocano words and swear words, goats and other Ilocano-related stuff.
 Bardagul never let go of the SIM with load, reasoning that he will use this, another Ilocano stereotype that they are frugal.
 This was also the 1st story arc of Igno Ramos who was introduced in 1998.

Pugad Baboy